Max Mell (1882–1971) was an Austrian writer. He wrote plays, novels and screenplays. He was born in Maribor, then part of the Austrian Empire but now in Slovenia. He studied at Vienna University, and served in the Austrian military during World War I. In 1914 he won the Bauernfeld Prize, and in 1929 he was awarded the Franz Grillparzer Prize. Culturally conservative, in 1951 he tried to counter what he regarded as Nazi distortions of the epic Nibelungenlied with a more faithful reading of the original text. In 1959 he was given the Austrian Decoration for Science and Art.

References

Bibliography 
 Winder McConnell. A Companion to the Nibelungenlied. Camden House, 1998.

External links 
 

1882 births
1971 deaths
Writers from Maribor
Austrian male dramatists and playwrights
Austrian male novelists
20th-century Austrian dramatists and playwrights
20th-century Austrian novelists
20th-century Austrian male writers
20th-century Austrian screenwriters